John Kwesi Dosunmu-Mensah better known as M.O.G Beatz, is a Ghanaian record producer who specializes in Afro-pop, Hip hop, Afrobeats, R&B, Hiplife, Fuji and Highlife.

Early life and Music career 
In 2016, M.O.G produced the hit single “RNS” by Sarkodie, The song won "HipLife Song Of The Year" award at the Ghana Music Awards UK and was nominated for "HipLife Song of the Year" at the 2017 edition of Vodafone Ghana Music Awards.He has won "Producer of the year" awards for Four consecutive times at 3music Awards making him the first and only producer Ghanaian music producer to achieve this. In 2023, M.O.G produced the new version of Bob Marley And The Wailers’ song ‘Stir It Up featuring Sarkodie.

Production credits 

 Sarkodie – RNS (2016)
 Sarkodie – Fa Sor Ho (2016)
 Sarkodie – Gboza (2017) 
 Sarkodie – Didi (2017)
 Shatta Wale - Waiti (2017)
 Shatta Wale – Opampam (2017)
 Shatta Wale – Ma Chargie (2017) 
 Shaker – Edawoso (2017)
 Eazzy - One Tin (2017)
 Captain Planet - Very Good Bad Guy (2017)
 EL - Elien Anthem (2017)
 EL - Mind Your Business (2017)
 Efya – Mamee feat. Mr Eazi (2017)
 Gallaxy - Qualities (2017)
 Kwaw Kese - 6:40 (2017)
 Sarkodie – Ye Be Pa Wo (2018) 
 Patapaa – One Perma feat. Medikal (2018)
 Shatta Wale – True Believer feat. Natty Lee & Addi Self (2018)
 Shatta Wale – Shito (2018)
 Stonebwoy – Dirty Enemies feat. Baby Jet (2018)
 Tzy Panchak - I'm Not Lucky (2018)
 Shatta Wale – Amount
 Wendy Shay – Uber Driver (2018)
 Wendy Shay – Astalavista (2018)
 Maccasio ft Mugeez- Dagomba Girl (2018)
MzVee ft Kuami Eugene - Bend Down
Dope Nation ft Olamide- Naami 
Dope Nation ft Medikal - Confam
Kizz Daniel - Poko 
Shatta Wale - Only One Man
Sarkodie ft Reekado - I Know
Sarkodie ft Efya - Saara
Sarkodie ft Rudeboy - Lucky
Sarkodie ft Prince Bright- Ofeets)
Sarkodie ft Coded - Year of return 
Kwesi Arthur ft Mr Eazi - Nobody 
Kwesi Arthur - Elevate 
Kwesi Arthur ft J Derobie - Father 
Kwesi Arthur - See no Evil
Wendy Shay - All For You
Wendy Shay ft Shatta Wale - Stevie Wonder
Kuami Eugene ft Sarkodie - No More
Kuami Eugene ft Kidi - Ohemaa
Kidi ft Kwesi Arthur - Mr Badmind
Adina - Sika
Fantana - So What
Fantana - Girls Hate on Girls
Medikal ft Kidi - Come Back
Kidi - Enjoyment 
Sarkodie - Overload 1 ft Efya
Sarkodie - Overload 2 ft Oxlade
Stonebwoy - Everlasting
Tulenkey  - Link UP
Quamina MP - Change your Style 
J Derobie - Riches
Mr Drew - Let me Know
Medikal ft King Promise - Odo
Sarkodie - Happy Day ft Kuami Eugene 
Wendy Shay ft Kuami Eugene - Wedding Day 
Joeboy - Focus (2021) 
Ebony Reigns  X Wendy Shay - John 8:7
Kidi - So Fine (2021)
Kidi - Mon Bébé (2021)
Sarkodie ft. Kwesi Arthur- Coachella (2021)
Sarkodie ft. Harmonize - I Wanna Love You (2021)
Sarkodie - Deserve my Love (2021)
 King Promise ft. Headie One - Ring My Line (2021)
Mr Drew ft. Kidi - Shuperu 
Darkovibes ft. Davido - Je M’apelle (2021)
Kelvynboy - Don Ding (2021)
Kwesi Arthur x Teni - Celebrate (2021)
Kevin Gates - Move (2021)
Kwesi Arthur - Disturb (2022)
Wendy Shay  - Survivor (2022)
Kidi ft Mavado - BLESSED (2022)
Adina - Adidede (2022)
Sarkodie ft Cina Soul - Over Me (2022)
Sarkodie ft Kranium - Forever (2022)
Sarkodie ft JoeBoy - Hips Don't Lie (2022)
Sarkodie ft Black Sherif - Country Side (2022)
Bob Marley And The Wailers’ ‘Stir it Up featuring Sarkodie

Awards and Nominations

References

1993 births
Living people
Ghanaian record producers